is a Japanese naval officer who served as the Self Defense Fleet's Commander of the Japanese Maritime Self Defence Force (JMSDF) from 2016 to 2019. He is the 49th Commander of the Self-Defense Fleet, succeeding Yasuhiro Shigeoka. In 2019, he was succeeded by Hiroyuki Kasui.

Career
Born in Kumamoto prefecture. In March 1983, he was graduated from the 27th term (electrical engineering) of the National Defense Academy, joined the Maritime Self-Defense Force.

In July 1997, he promoted to 2nd class Kaisa.

In March 1998, he was transferred to the escort ship Setogiri artillery chief and deputy chief.

On 26 March 1999, he became the Captain of the escort ship Matsuyuki.

On 24 March 2000, Operation Division, Defense Department, Maritime Staff Office.

On 1 January 2002, he was promoted to 1st class Kaisa.

On 20 August 2003, Maritime Staff Office Defense Department Defense Division Business Planning Group Leader and Maritime Self-Defense Force Executive School Work.

On 5 March 2004, Maritime Staff Office Defense Department Defense Division Defense Team Leader and Maritime Self-Defense Force Executive School Work.

On 1 August 2005, he became the Commander of the 3rd Escort Corps.

On 31 July 2006, Chief of Equipment System Division, Defense Department, Maritime Staff Office.

On 1 September 2007, Assistant Manager, Personnel Education Department, Maritime Staff Office.

On 1 August 2008, he was promoted to Rear Admiral. On 1 December, Commander of the 1st Escort Group.

On 20 August 2010, Fleet Submarine Force Command Chief.

On 5 August 2011, Director of Training Department, National Defense Academy.

On 26 July 2012, Director of Defense Department, Maritime Staff Office.

On 5 August 2014, he was promoted to Maritime General, Chief of Maritime Self-Defense Force Executive School.

On 4 August 2015, 42nd Sasebo District Chief.

On 22 December 2016, he was appointed the 49th Commander of the Self-Defense Fleet.

On 1 April 2019, he was retired from the Navy.

Awards
 
 3rd Defensive Memorial Cordon

 7th Defensive Memorial Cordon

 10th Defensive Memorial Cordon

 11th Defensive Memorial Cordon

 13th Defensive Memorial Cordon

 15th Defensive Memorial Cordon

 18th Defensive Memorial Cordon

 22nd Defensive Memorial Cordon

 24th Defensive Memorial Cordon

 33rd Defensive Memorial Cordon

 40th Defensive Memorial Cordon

 41st Defensive Memorial Cordon

See also
Japanese military ranks

References

1960 births
People from Kumamoto Prefecture
Military personnel from Kumamoto Prefecture
Living people